Celaenorrhinus suzannae is a species of butterfly in the family Hesperiidae. It is found in the Democratic Republic of the Congo (Eala and Sankuru).

References

Butterflies described in 1976
suzannae
Endemic fauna of the Democratic Republic of the Congo